Christian Kühlwetter (born 21 April 1996) is a German professional footballer who plays as a forward for 1. FC Heidenheim.

Career
In summer 2020, Kühlwetter, along with teammate Florian Pick, joined 2. Bundesliga side 1. FC Heidenheim from 3. Liga club 1. FC Kaiserslautern.

References

External links
 
 Profile at kicker.de

Living people
1996 births
Sportspeople from Bonn
Footballers from North Rhine-Westphalia
German footballers
Association football forwards
1. FC Köln II players
1. FC Kaiserslautern II players
1. FC Kaiserslautern players
1. FC Heidenheim players
3. Liga players
Regionalliga players